NEC is a Japanese electronics manufacturer, formerly "Nippon Electric Company".

NEC may refer to:

Companies, government, and organizations
 Nepal Engineering Council, an autonomous government agency of Nepal
 National Economic Commission, a deficit reduction commission in the United States
 National Electoral Commission (Somaliland)
 National Economic Council (United Kingdom)
 National Economic Council (United States) in the Executive Office of the US President
 National Elections Commission, an autonomous government agency of Liberia
 National Electrostatics Corporation, a manufacturer of particle accelerators
 National Empowerment Center, a US mental health advocacy and recovery organization
 National Enterprise Corporation, a state corporation of Uganda
 National Executive Committee of the Labour Party
 National Executive of the Bharatiya Janata Party
 National Executive Committee of the African National Congress
 National Executive Committee for Space-Based Positioning, Navigation and Timing
 Negro Ensemble Company, New York City theatre company
 National Electricity Company (NEK EAD), a Bulgarian electricity company
 New England Coalition, an anti-nuclear organization based in Brattleboro, VT
 Niagara Escarpment Commission, an agency of the Ontario government
 The ASX stock ticker for Nine Entertainment, an Australian media company
 North Eastern Council
 National Entertainment Commission, a former name of the Media Rating Council

Exhibition centres
National Exhibition Centre, the largest exhibition centre in the UK in Birmingham, England
NEC Group, the British company operating the National Exhibition Centre and other venues

Educational institutions
New England Conservatory, America's oldest independent music conservatory
National Engineering College in Tamil Nadu, India
National Extension College, a UK specialist in online and distance learning, based in Cambridge
New England College, a private college in Henniker, New Hampshire
Native Education Centre, a private college in Vancouver, Canada

Engineering
 National Electrical Code, a US design standard on electrical wiring and equipment in construction
 New Engineering Contract, a formalised system created by the UK Institution of Civil Engineers which guides the drafting of documents on civil engineering and construction projects

Sports
 Teams sponsored by NEC Corporation in Japan:
NEC Green Rockets, rugby union
NEC Red Rockets, women's volleyball
NEC Blue Rockets, men's volleyball
NEC Nijmegen, a Dutch football club
Northeast Conference, an NCAA athletics conference
Northeastern Conference, a high school athletic conference in Massachusetts, United States
North Egypt Conference, former Illinois, US high school athletic conference

Health
No effect concentration in chemical hazards
Necrotizing enterocolitis, a medical condition usually affecting premature infants
National Emission Ceiling, part of EU Directive 2001/81/EC regarding air pollution

Science and mathematics
Non-Euclidean crystallographic group, a group of symmetries in hyperbolic geometry
Numerical Electromagnetics Code, a computer program used to simulate antennas

Military
Navy Enlisted Classification, US Navy
Network-enabled capability, a UK military doctrine for using information systems

Other
Northeast Corridor, a rail line on the east coast of the United States